The 2008 Skyrunning European Championships was the 2nd edition of the global skyrunning competition, Skyrunning European Championships, organised by the International Skyrunning Federation and was held in Zegama (Spain), took place on 25 May 2008, coinciding with the Zegama-Aizkorri Maratoia.

Results
The race of the VII Zegama-Aizkorri Maratoia (42.195 km) was the only competition with 391 athletes who reached the finish line of both sexes and nations (including non-European ones). obviously the medals of the European Championships were awarded by compiling single rankings, male and female, and not including non-European athletes.

Men's SkyRace

Women's SkyRace

References

External links
 International Skyrunning Federation official web site
 Zegama-Aizkorri Maratoia official web site

Skyrunning European Championships